Blood Year is the seventh studio album by American instrumental rock band Russian Circles, released on August 1, 2019 through Sargent House. The album was recorded and produced at GodCity Studio in Salem and Steve Albini's Electrical Audio Studio in Chicago by Kurt Ballou.

Track listing

Personnel 
Russian Circles
 Brian Cook – bass
 Mike Sullivan – guitar
 Dave Turncrantz – drums

Technical personnel
 Kurt Ballou – recording, engineering, production

Charts

References 

2019 albums
Russian Circles albums
Sargent House albums
Albums produced by Kurt Ballou